Lewiston is an unincorporated community in Jasper County, Indiana, in the United States.

Lewiston was platted in 1901. The Kankakee River passes through the northern area of Jasper County.

References

Unincorporated communities in Jasper County, Indiana
Unincorporated communities in Indiana